Al-Rawdah or al-Batrounah (Arabic: الروضة أو البطرونة) is a Syrian village in the Al-Zabadani District of the Rif Dimashq Governorate. According to the Syria Central Bureau of Statistics (CBS), Al-Rawdah had a population of 4,536 in the 2004 census.

References 

Populated places in Al-Zabadani District